The Ohio State Football All-Century Team was chosen in early 2000 by the Touchdown Club of Columbus. It was selected to honor the greatest Ohio State Buckeyes football players of the 20th century.  No effort was made to distinguish a first team or second team, the organization instead choosing only to select an 80-man roster and a five-man coaching staff.

Members selected to the team were honored at a banquet on February 19, 2000.  Living members of the team elected all-century captains and an all-century Most Valuable Player.  As captains they chose Archie Griffin and Rex Kern on offense, and Chris Spielman and Jack Tatum on defense.  Archie Griffin was selected as MVP.

The selected team

Table notes
* CFHoF? notes whether the person has been inducted into the College Football Hall of Fame; VOHoF? notes whether the person has been inducted into the Ohio State Varsity O Hall of Fame.
(c) – All-Century captains

Notes regarding selections
 Notable Buckeyes not chosen to the team include College Football Hall of Fame players Jim Daniel and Aurelius Thomas, Hall of Fame coaches Francis Schmidt and Howard Jones, Big Ten Conference MVPs Jack Graf and Cornelius Greene, and three-time All-America selection Lew Hinchman.
 Players lettering before 1960 could have been selected for either offensive or defensive positions.  Selecting Jim Marshall as an offensive tackle was ironic, given that he played professionally for 20 years as a defensive lineman, primarily with the Minnesota Vikings.
 Matt Snell played for the Buckeyes as a halfback in 1961, a defensive end in 1962, and a fullback in 1963.  He was the Buckeye Season MVP in 1963 and AFL Rookie of the Year in 1964 (with the New York Jets) as a fullback, but was selected here as a defensive end.
 Paul Warfield was a halfback for the Buckeyes in 1961 and 1962, and a tight end in 1963.  He was selected here as a wide receiver, the position he played professionally with the Cleveland Browns and Miami Dolphins.
 Les Horvath was a halfback in 1940, 1941 and 1942, and a quarterback in his Heisman-trophy winning season of 1944.  He was selected here as a halfback.

References
 Tim May, Columbus Dispatch, "Touchdown Club Chooses Griffin as All-Century MVP," Sunday, February 20, 2000
 https://www.skylinepictures.com/OSU_All_Century_Team_o89_full.htm

Ohio State Buckeyes football